Sośnica Gliwice is a Polish women's handball team, based in Gliwice.

See also 
 Handball in Poland
 Sports in Poland

Sport in Gliwice
Polish handball clubs